Arthur Ogden was an English professional footballer who played as an inside forward.

References

Year of birth unknown
Footballers from Burnley
English footballers
Association football forwards
Burnley F.C. players
English Football League players
Year of death missing